Lukavice may refer to places:

Czech Republic
Lukavice (Chrudim District), a municipality and village in the Pardubice Region
Lukavice (Rychnov nad Kněžnou District), a municipality and village in the Hradec Králové Region
Lukavice (Šumperk District), a municipality and village in the Olomouc Region
Lukavice (Ústí nad Orlicí District), a municipality and village in the Pardubice Region
Lukavice, a village and administrative part of Strážov in the Plzeň Region
Dolní Lukavice, a municipality and village in the Plzeň Region
Horní Lukavice, a municipality and village in the Plzeň Region

Bosnia and Herzegovina
Lukavice, Sanski Most, a village in the Una-Sana Canton

See also
Lukavec (disambiguation)
Lukavica (disambiguation)